Hildburghausen II – Sonneberg II is an electoral constituency (German: Wahlkreis) represented in the Landtag of Thuringia. It elects one member via first-past-the-post voting. Under the current constituency numbering system, it is designated as constituency 20. It covers the eastern part of Hildburghausen district and the northern part of Sonneberg district.

Hildburghausen II – Sonneberg II was created for the 1994 state election. Since 2004, it has been represented by Henry Worm of the Christian Democratic Union (CDU).

Geography
As of the 2019 state election, Hildburghausen II – Sonneberg II covers the eastern part of Hildburghausen district and the northern part of Sonneberg district, specifically the municipalities of Auengrund, Brünn/Thür., Eisfeld, Masserberg, Schleusegrund, and Schleusingen (from Hildburghausen), and Goldisthal, Lauscha, Neuhaus am Rennweg (excluding Lichte und Piesau), and Steinach (from Sonneberg).

Members
The constituency has been held by the Christian Democratic Union since its creation in 1994. Its first representative was Bernd Wolf, who served from 1994 to 2004. Since 2004, it has been represented by Henry Worm.

Election results

2019 election

2014 election

2009 election

2004 election

1999 election

1994 election

References

Electoral districts in Thuringia
1994 establishments in Germany
Sonneberg (district)
Hildburghausen (district)
Constituencies established in 1994